Titan is the district center of Saghar District, Ghor province, Afghanistan. Very close to Titan is the village of Saghar which gives the name of the district.

Climate
Titan has a warm-summer humid continental climate (Dsb) under the Köppen climate classification system. Temperatures typically range between -5 °C (23 °F) and 21 °C (71 °F) through the year, but rarely can drop to -23 °C (-9 °F) or can rise to as high as 33 °C (92 °F).

The warmest months in Titan are June, July and August, with daily mean temperatures ranging from 18 to 21 °C (65 - 71 °F) throughout the day. The coldest temperatures usually occur in January, February and December, when daily mean temperatures range from -5 to -1 °C (23 - 30 °F) throughout the day. On average each year, Titan experiences 86 days above 25 °C (77.0 °F) and 139 days below 0 °C (32.0 °F).

References

See also
Ghōr Province

Populated places in Ghor Province